Dasht-e Abbas (also Romanized as Dasht-e ‘Abbās and Dasht Abbās) is a village in Dasht-e Abbas Rural District, Musian District, Dehloran County, Ilam Province, Iran. In 2006, its population was 144, in 27 families.

References 

Populated places in Dehloran County